Luis Usoz Quintana (19 October 1932 in San Sebastián – 10 March 1992) was a Spanish field hockey player who competed in the 1960 Summer Olympics and in the 1964 Summer Olympics. He was the father of fellow international and Olympic hockey player Pablo Usoz.

References

External links
 

1932 births
1992 deaths
Spanish male field hockey players
Olympic field hockey players of Spain
Field hockey players at the 1960 Summer Olympics
Field hockey players at the 1964 Summer Olympics
Olympic bronze medalists for Spain
Olympic medalists in field hockey
Sportspeople from San Sebastián
Medalists at the 1960 Summer Olympics
Field hockey players from the Basque Country (autonomous community)
20th-century Spanish people